Meena Kumari (born 17 July 1983) is an Indian shooter. She is from Bilaspur district of Himachal Pradesh.

She along with Tejaswini Sawant won a bronze medal in at the 2010 Commonwealth Games. They secured the bronze after losing by just a margin of one point.

In the Commonwealth Games 2014, Meena finished sixth with a score of 615.3 points in the women's 50-metre rifle prone finals at the Barry Buddon Shooting Centre. She finished fourth with a score of 586 at the 2010 Asian Games held at the Aoti Range in Guangzhou.

References

External links 
 
 
 

1983 births
Living people
Indian female sport shooters
Commonwealth Games bronze medallists for India
Commonwealth Games medallists in shooting
Shooters at the 2010 Commonwealth Games
Shooters at the 2014 Commonwealth Games
Shooters at the 2010 Asian Games
21st-century Indian women
21st-century Indian people
People from Bilaspur, Himachal Pradesh
Sportswomen from Himachal Pradesh
Sport shooters from Himachal Pradesh
Asian Games competitors for India
Medallists at the 2010 Commonwealth Games